Eliezer Avtabi (born 5 January 1938) is a former Israeli politician who served as a member of the Knesset for the National Religious Party between 1974 and 1984.

Biography
Born in Takab in Iran, Avtabi made aliyah to Israel in 1950. He joined moshav Shibolim, and was a member of Hapoel HaMizrachi moshav movement. He became deputy chairman of Azata Regional Council, and was a member of the directorate of Negev Regional Factories.

In 1973 he was elected to the Knesset on the National Religious Party list, taking his seat in 1974. He was re-elected in 1977 and 1981, before losing his seat in the 1984 elections.

References

External links
 

1938 births
Iranian Jews
People from West Azerbaijan Province
Iranian emigrants to Israel
Living people
National Religious Party politicians
Members of the 8th Knesset (1974–1977)
Members of the 9th Knesset (1977–1981)
Members of the 10th Knesset (1981–1984)
Israeli politicians of Iranian descent